Fire Away may refer to:

Fire Away (game), a handheld electronic games marketed by Tandy beginning in the 1980s
Fire Away (album), by Ozomatli, 2010
"Fire Away" (song), by Chris Stapleton from Traveller, 2015 
"Fire Away", a 2003 song by Gyroscope from Midnight Express
"Fire Away", a 2007 song by Jupiter One from their eponymous album
Fire Away, a 2007 album and the title song from Kill the Alarm
"Fire Away", a 2015 song by Rey Pila from The Future Sugar